Air Vice-Marshal John Hugh Samuel Tyssen,  (20 June 1889 – 4 January 1953) was a British Royal Flying Corps pilot during the First World War and a senior Royal Air Force commander during the first half of the Second World War. He was Air Officer Commanding British Forces in Iraq (20 November 1937 – November 1939)

References

Air of Authority – A History of RAF Organisation – Air Vice-Marshal J H S Tyssen

|-

|-

|-

1889 births
1953 deaths
Companions of the Order of the Bath
Recipients of the Military Cross
Royal Air Force air marshals of World War II
Royal Air Force personnel of World War I
Royal Flying Corps officers
Somerset Light Infantry officers